Kevin Edwards (born 18 June 1962) is a Guyanese cricketer. He played in one List A and four first-class matches for Guyana in 1985/86 and 1986/87.

See also
 List of Guyanese representative cricketers

References

External links
 

1962 births
Living people
Guyanese cricketers
Guyana cricketers